Events from the 11th century in Denmark.

Monarchs 

 Sweyn Forkbeard, 986–1014
 Harald II of Denmark, 1014–c. 1018
 Cnut the Great, 1018–1035
 Harthacnut, 1035–1042
 Magnus the Good, 1042–1047
 Sweyn II, 1047–1076
 Harald III, 1076–1080
 Canute IV, 1080–1086
 Olaf I, 1086–1095
 Eric I, 1095–1103

Events 

 1013 – Sweyn Forkbeard again invades England, briefly taking the English throne.
 3 February 1014 – Sweyn Forkbeard dies in Gainsborough, and Æthelred regains the English throne from the Danish.
 18 October 1016 – Cnut the Great reconquers England at the Battle of Assandun. In the treaty which followed, Cnut gained control of all of England except Wessex.
 30 November 1016 – Edmund Ironside dies, and his control of Wessex is handed over to Cnut.
 12 November 1035 – Cnut dies, and the kingdoms of Denmark and England are once again made separate.
 17 June 1040 – King Harthacnut lands at Sandwich and regains the English throne.
 8 June 1042 – Harthacnut dies and Magnus the Good succeeds him as King of Denmark while Edward the Confessor becomes king of England.
 9 August 1062 – Danish forces are defeated by Harald III of Norway at the naval Battle of Niså.
 1064 – a peace agreement is reached between Harald III and Sweyn II, ending Harald III's invasions of Denmark.

Births 

 1096 – Canute Lavard (died 1131)

Date unknown

 c. 1040 – Harald Hen (died 1080)
 c. 1042 – Canute IV of Denmark (died 1086)
 c. 1050 – Sweyn the Crusader (died 1097 in modern-day Turkey)
 c. 1050 – Olaf I of Denmark (died 1095)
 c. 1060 – Eric I of Denmark (died 1103 in Cyprus)
 c. 1062 – Bjørn Svendsen (died c. 1100 in Rendsburg)
 c. 1063 – Niels, King of Denmark (died 1134)
 c. 1078 – Asser Rig (died 1151)
 c. 1080 – Harald Kesja (died 1135)
 c. 1082 – Ingegerd Knutsdatter
 c. 1083 – Cecilia Knutsdatter (died c. 1131)
 c. 1084 – Charles the Good (died 1127 in Flanders)
 c. 1090 – Eric II of Denmark (died 1137)
 c. 1090 – Henrik Skadelår (died 1134)

Deaths 

 3 February 1014 – Sweyn Forkbeard (born 963, died in England)
 1026 – Ulf Jarl
 12 November 1035 – Cnut the Great (born c. 990, died in England)
 1035 – Svein Knutsson (born c. 1016)
 25 October 1047 – Magnus the Good (born c. 1034 in Norway)
 28 April 1076 – Sweyn II of Denmark (born c. 1019 in England)
 17 April 1080 – Harald Hen (born c. 1040)
 10 July 1086 – Canute IV of Denmark (born c. 1042)
 18 August 1095 – Olaf I of Denmark (born c. 1050)

Date unknown

 c. 1018 – Harald II of Denmark (born c. 997)
 c. 1048 – Gyda of Sweden, Queen consort
 c. 1065 – Theodgar of Vestervig

References 

 
Centuries in Denmark